Martin Obuch (born October 8, 1991) is a Slovak professional ice hockey defenceman who is currently playing with Bordeaux in the FFHG Division 1.

References

External links

Living people
MHC Martin players
1991 births
Slovak ice hockey defencemen
Sportspeople from Martin, Slovakia
Expatriate ice hockey players in France
Slovak expatriate ice hockey people
Slovak expatriate sportspeople in France